Tom or Tommy Healy (1855 in Littleton, County Tipperary – ?) was an Irish sportsperson.  He played hurling with his local club Thurles Sarsfields and was a member of the very first Tipperary inter-county team in 1887.

Tommy Healy was born in Coolcroo, Littleton, County Tipperary in 1855.  He was noted as a fine sportsperson and represented his native Thurles hurling club in the 1880s.  In 1887 he won a Tipperary Senior Hurling Championship title with the club, and was consequently picked, with the rest of the team, to represent Tipperary in the inaugural All-Ireland Senior Hurling Championship.  Healy's most notable moment came when he scored the very first goal in an All-Ireland Hurling Final.  This happened in the 1887 final, when Tipperary played against Galway.  Healy took a pass from team captain Jim Stapleton and made no mistake in sending a low, hard drive to the back of the opposition's net.

Teams

References

 Corry, Eoghan, The GAA Book of Lists (Hodder Headline Ireland).

1855 births
Year of death missing
Thurles Sarsfields hurlers
Tipperary inter-county hurlers
All-Ireland Senior Hurling Championship winners